Lecithocera raphidica is a moth in the family Lecithoceridae described by László Anthony Gozmány in 1978. It is found in Jiangsu, China.

References

Moths described in 1978
raphidica